The 1997 UST Growling Tigers men's basketball team represented University of Santo Tomas in the 60th season of the University Athletic Association of the Philippines. The men's basketball tournament for the school year 1997–98 began on July 12, 1997, and the host school for the season was Adamson University.

UST won their last six games after suffering back-to-back losses in between the two rounds of the double round-robin eliminations, for a second-place finish with 10 wins against 4 losses. The De La Salle Green Archers had the same win–loss record but were ranked lower on an inferior -5 quotient.

Two of their games went into overtime, with both resulting to wins over the FEU Tamaraws, 79–71 in the first round; and against the UE Red Warriors, 85–77 in the second round.

The Tigers lost their Final Four match against La Salle, their recurrent playoff opponent since 1994. UST squandered their twice-to-beat advantage with a 73–82 loss, resulting to a knockout game, where they were eventually eliminated after a 72–74 overtime loss.

Roster

Depth chart

Roster changes
The Tigers lost team captain and Season 58 MVP Chris Cantonjos to graduation, as well as Mythical team awardee Estong Ballesteros, who decided to join the 1997 PBA Rookie Draft.  In their place, UST was able to recruit blue chips from the high school ranks, with UST Tiger Cub Emmerson Oreta who was hailed the UAAP Season 59 Juniors MVP and Mapúa High School's Marvin Ortiguerra, the Juniors MVP of the NCAA in Season 71 coming onboard.

Subtractions

Additions

Schedule and results

Preseason tournament

UAAP games

Elimination games were played in a double round-robin format. All games were aired on PTV 4 by Silverstar Sports.

Postseason tournaments

Players drafted into the PBA
Richard Melencio and Ryan Bernardo decided to turn professional after the 1997 season and signed with the Metropolitan Basketball Association's Pangasinan Presidents and Laguna Lakers teams respectively. Both players later applied for the PBA draft, with Bernardo getting picked in the fourth round in 2001 by the Louie Alas-led Mobiline Phone Pals, and Melencio landing the 32nd overall pick in 2002 with the Shell Turbo Chargers team.

References

UST Growling Tigers basketball team seasons
UAAP Season 60